Telmatobius hockingi is a species of frog in the family Telmatobiidae.
It is endemic to Peru.
Its natural habitats are subtropical or tropical moist montane forest and rivers.
It is threatened by habitat loss.

References

hockingi
Amphibians of the Andes
Amphibians of Peru
Endemic fauna of Peru
Taxonomy articles created by Polbot
Amphibians described in 1996